Ángel Montoro Sánchez (born 25 June 1988) is a Spanish professional footballer who plays for Real Oviedo as a central midfielder.

Club career
A product of hometown Valencia CF's youth ranks, Montoro was born in Valencia. He made his first-team debut on 31 October 2007, playing ten minutes in a 1–5 La Liga home loss against Real Madrid as interim manager Óscar Fernández filled in for the recently dismissed Quique Sánchez Flores; with Ronald Koeman's subsequent arrival and the January 2008 signing of Hedwiges Maduro and Éver Banega, he had to return to the reserves.

In the following two years, Montoro served as many loans (both in the Segunda División), with Real Murcia and newly promoted Real Unión. Released by the Che in the summer of 2012, he continued competing at that level with Recreativo de Huelva.

Montoro signed for UD Almería also of the second division on 30 June 2015. On 26 January of the following year, he terminated his contract and joined top-flight club UD Las Palmas for 18 months.

On 15 July 2017, free agent Montoro agreed to a three-year deal with Granada CF. In the 2018–19 season, he scored five goals to help his side return to the top division as runners-up.

Montoro tested positive for COVID-19 in July 2021. He left Granada the following June after their relegation, and signed a one-year contract with second-tier Real Oviedo.

Career statistics

Club

Honours
Valencia
Copa del Rey: 2007–08

Spain U19
UEFA European Under-19 Championship: 2007

References

External links

CiberChe biography and stats 

1988 births
Living people
Spanish footballers
Footballers from Valencia (city)
Association football midfielders
La Liga players
Segunda División players
Segunda División B players
Tercera División players
Valencia CF Mestalla footballers
Valencia CF players
Real Murcia players
Real Unión footballers
Recreativo de Huelva players
UD Almería players
UD Las Palmas players
Granada CF footballers
Real Oviedo players
Spain youth international footballers